The House of Monchy is an aristocratic family from Picardy in France.

Notable members
Charles de Monchy d'Hocquincourt, 17th-century French military leader 
 François Willem de Monchy (1749–1796), physician at Rotterdam
 Marinus and René de Monchy, of Rotterdam, 19th-century leading Dutch business men 
Salomon de Monchy (1880–1961), burgomaster of Arnhem 1921 to 1934 and of The Hague 1934 to 1947

References

French noble families